Sheldon Jackson College (SJC) was a small private college located on Baranof Island in Sitka, Alaska, United States.  Founded in 1878, it was the oldest institution of higher learning in Alaska and maintained a historic relationship with the Presbyterian Church. The college was named in honor of Rev. Sheldon Jackson, an early missionary and educational leader in Alaska.

Due to declining enrollment, the college closed in 2007; four years later, ownership of its campus was transferred to the organization behind the Sitka Fine Arts Camp. In addition to the fine arts camp, the Sheldon Jackson Museum, the Sitka Sound Science Center, the Sitka Summer Music Festival, the Sitka International Hostel, Outer Coast College, and several other organizations are located in buildings on the campus of the former school. The school buildings are part of the Sheldon Jackson School National Historic Landmark District.

History
Similar to the Carlisle Indian School, Sheldon Jackson College (SJC) was initially formed as a "training" school for Alaska Native boys.  The school was founded in 1878 by Fannie Kellogg and future Governor of Alaska John G. Brady for the Tlingit people.  Initially known as the Sitka Industrial and Training School, it nearly closed in 1882 after its original facility, located over a military barracks, burned down.  The Presbyterian missionary Sheldon Jackson came to the rescue of the school, raising funds through a national campaign, leading to the construction of a new building on the site of the present campus.  In 1910, after Rev. Jackson died, the school was renamed in his honor.

The institution added a boarding high school in 1917, and a college program in 1944.  The college program gained accreditation in 1966 and the high school was closed the following year.

Closure
The school's educational accreditation was reviewed by the Northwest Commission on Colleges and Universities and State of Alaska, a process that happens nationally with colleges and universities.  About this process, President David Dobler said, "SJC’s current authorization to operate as an Alaska post-secondary institution has been extended until July 2006, and SJC, at that time, will be required to provide the Alaska Commission on Postsecondary Education (ACPE) with documentation of financial and administrative capacity in order for authorization to be renewed."  (Dobler left the office of President in 2002.) Similarly, the college was under a "show cause" order from the Northwest Commission and was required to "show cause" why its regional accreditation should not be revoked.

On June 29, 2007, all academic operations were suspended and all faculty and staff were dismissed due to cash flow shortages. The Board of Trustees gathered all staff and informed them that June 29 would be the final day of employment. They were also informed all health insurance coverage would cease at that time.

On July 17, 2007, the Alaska Commission on Post-secondary Education announced the cancellation of Sheldon Jackson College's authorization to operate a college in Alaska.  The college appealed the decision, but was ultimately shut down.

In March 2008, the official website for the school went off-line. In the summer of 2008, the college opened its dorms and facilities for use by local workers and companies.

In 2010 the school library collection of rare books and artwork was boxed and stored.

On February 1, 2011, the Board of Trustees transferred the main campus to Alaska Arts Southeast, Inc., the non-profit parent organization to the Sitka Fine Arts Camp.

Beginning in 2018, Outer Coast College students, professors and faculty members have been hosted on the main campus.

Notable alumni
 Sandra Marbut, Head Coach of women's basketball at California Institute of Technology
 Edward Marsden Presbyterian minister, Tsimshian activist
 Benjamin A. Haldane Tsimshian photographer, musician, businessman
 Scott McAdams, mayor of Sitka, U.S. Senate candidate
 Elizabeth Peratrovich, civil rights activist
 Walter Soboleff, Tlingit scholar, Alaska Native Brotherhood Grand President Emeritus
 Byron Mallott, Tlingit leader and rights activist, 12th Lieutenant Governor of Alaska

Architecture and historic designation
The Sheldon Jackson Museum was the first building in Alaska built with concrete.  Its octagonal shape may have been influenced by architectural philosophies of O.S. Fowler.

The main campus buildings were designed by the, then just starting, firm of Ludlow and Peabody of Boston with aspects of western stick style.  Beams were of Douglas fir and design was kept simple and exposed for easy construction and to demonstrate "honesty in building".

In 1972, the Sheldon Jackson Museum building was added as a single property to the National Register of Historic Places.  The entire school, comprising 18 contributing properties and 3 non-contributing buildings, was designated a National Historic Landmark District in 2001.

Campus buildings

The contributing properties to the historic district, built between 1895 and the 1930s, are:
The Sheldon Jackson Museum, AHRS# SIT-007, built 1895.
The North Cottage, AHRS# SIT-00254, built 1900.
The Ceramics Building, also known as the Storehouse, AHRS# SIT-00553, built 1910-1911.
The Richard H. Allen Memorial Building, also known as the Allen Memorial Hall and Allen Auditorium, AHRS# SIT-00216, built 1910-1911.
The Whitmore Hall, also known as Home Missions Hall, AHRS# SIT-00219, built 1910-1911.
The Power Plant and Laundry Building, AHRS# SIT-00221, built 1910-1911.
The Fraser Hall, AHRS# SIT-00220, built 1910-1911.
The Stevenson Hall, AHRS# SIT-00217, built 1911.
The North Pacific Hall, AHRS# SIT-00218, built 1911.
The Nancy Craig Cottage, AHRS# SIT-00253, built 1914.
The Ocean Vista Cottage, also known as the Presbyterian Manse, AHRS# SIT-00215, built 1914.
The West Cottage, AHRS# SIT-00251, built 1915.
The Houk House, also known as the Lottie Hapgood Practice Cottage, AHRS# SIT-00223, built 1918.
The Tillie Paul Manor, also known as the Infirmary, AHRS# SIT-00222, built 1926.
The Ada F. Pears Cottage, AHRS# SIT-00255, built 1926.
The Sage Building, AHRS# SIT-00224, built 1929.
The Sawmill, AHRS# SIT-00554, built in the 1930s.
The Quadrangle area, AHRS# SIT-00566.

Additional campus buildings are:
Stratton Library, built 1974.

Stratton Library
Stratton Library was an academic library at the college. Prior to the construction of the building the university's collection was held in the Yaw Building.  Prior to the 1955 construction of the Yaw Building, the books were held in a prefabricated army building that had been abandoned and moved onto campus in 1947.  The Stratton library building contained 48,000 items in its collection with over 10 percent of all material being directly related to Alaska's history, including many first edition books and rare periodicals. In December 2010 the collection was broken up. Rare glass plate photographic negatives were loaned to the National Park Service, other "Alaskana" was split among local public and academic libraries, and the remainder of the collection was offered for sale to the general public. The building itself was sold to the State of Alaska.

Sheldon Jackson Museum

The Sheldon Jackson Museum is a Native American museum located on the former campus of Sheldon Jackson College. Many of the artifacts were originally collected by Rev. Sheldon Jackson in his travels through rural Alaska. Sheldon Jackson Museum was founded in 1887, becoming the first museum in the state of Alaska.  When it outgrew its temporary quarters, a new specially dedicated concrete structure was constructed between 1895 and 1897 and, upon completion, became the first concrete structure built in Alaska.

The museum, collection, and grounds are currently owned and administered by the State of Alaska. Organized within the Alaska Department of Education & Early Development, Division of Libraries, Archives and Museums, the Sheldon Jackson Museum was purchased by the State in the mid-1980s during the administration of Governor Bill Sheffield.

Collection
Many of the artifacts housed in the museum (over 5,000) were originally collected by Rev. Sheldon Jackson in his travels through rural Alaska. The museum's collection almost exclusively focus on Alaskan Native groups such as the Aleuts, Athabascans, Eskimos, and Tlingit/Tsimshian.

An affiliated advocacy group, Friends of the Sheldon Jackson Museum, operate an on-site museum gift shop that exclusively carries items crafted by Alaska Native artists. The organization also sponsors several museum programs, including the Alaska Native Artist Demonstrators Program during the summer months.

See also

List of National Historic Landmarks in Alaska
National Register of Historic Places listings in Sitka City and Borough, Alaska

Notes

References

External links

  (sheldonjackson.edu)
  (sj-alaska.edu)
 Sheldon Jackson Museum - official website

Buildings and structures in Sitka, Alaska
Defunct schools in Alaska
Defunct private universities and colleges in Alaska
Educational institutions disestablished in 2007
Educational institutions established in 1878
Institutions accredited by the American Alliance of Museums
Museums in Sitka, Alaska
Native American museums in Alaska
1878 establishments in Alaska
2007 disestablishments in Alaska
Octagonal school buildings in the United States